Calmar can refer to:

Calmar, a genus of planthoppers
Calmar, Iowa, United States, a town in Winneshiek County, Iowa
Calmar, Alberta, Canada
Calmar ratio, a calculation of investment performance
Kalmar, Sweden
 Kalmar Union (1397-1523), a personal union that joined under a single monarch the kingdoms of Denmark, Norway and Sweden